The Lexus of Blackburn Heritage Classic was a golf tournament held in Australia in January 2013  at the Heritage Golf & Country Club, Chirnside Park, Melbourne. Prize money was A$130,000. David Bransdon, Lucas Herbert and Max McCardle tied on 274 but Bransdon won the playoff with a birdie at the first extra hole.

The sponsor was Lexus of Blackburn, a car dealership. They also sponsored the Lexus of Blackburn Victorian PGA Championship in 2014.

Winners

References

Former PGA Tour of Australasia events
Golf tournaments in Australia
Golf in Victoria (Australia)